= Jennifer Glasse =

American broadcast journalist

Jennifer Glasse is an American broadcast journalist, currently working for NPR and the CBC. Glasse had been with Al Jazeera English since 2011, and is now a correspondent in Kabul in Afghanistan. In 1997, she won an Overseas Press Club award for her work in Zaire and in 2003 she received a Gracie Allen award.
